Sinter may refer to:

 Sinter plant, in which iron-ore dust gets mixed with other fine materials at high temperature, to create a product – sinter – for use in a blast furnace
 Sintering, a high temperature process for fusing powder together
 Calcareous sinter, calcium carbonate deposited by springs
 Siliceous sinter, silica deposited by hot springs and geysers
 Sinter, a racecar constructed by Fluid Motorsport Development